The Awatiñas are a Bolivian folk music group begun in the 1970s by Mario Conde. Their ballads are mostly sung in Spanish and Aymara. They are popular across much of Latin America and have a substantial following in parts of Europe, Asia, and North America.

Songs
Among their best-known works are:

 “Kullita”
 “Mi triste adiós”
 “Tu traición”
 “Tunkata P'a Tunkaru”
 “Tunkata pá tunkaru”
 “Dulce Bolivianita”

Discography
Contributing artist
 The Rough Guide to the Music of the Andes (1996, World Music Network)

References

Bolivian musical groups
Andean music